Polyacanthia flavipes is a species of beetle in the family Cerambycidae. It was described by White in 1846, originally under the genus Lamia. It is known from New Zealand.

References

Pogonocherini
Beetles described in 1846